Pythis may refer to:
 an alternative name for Pythius of Priene, a Greek architect of the 4th century BCE
 Pythis (weevil), a beetle genus in the tribe Polydrusini